Hirotaka (written: , , , , , , , , , , , , , , , , ,  or ) is a masculine Japanese given name. Notable people with the name include:

, Japanese politician
, Japanese actor and voice actor
, Japanese baseball player
, Japanese samurai
, Japanese footballer
, Japanese politician
, Japanese shogi player
, Japanese baseball player
, Japanese footballer
, Japanese shogi player
, Japanese judoka
, Japanese physicist
, Japanese actor and voice actor
, Japanese daimyō
, Japanese businessman and academic
, Japanese footballer
, Japanese footballer
, Japanese football manager
, Japanese mixed martial artist
, Japanese field hockey player

Japanese masculine given names